Plaisted is a surname and occasional masculine given name.  People with the name Plaisted include:

Surname
 David Plaisted, American professor of computer science
 Frederick W. Plaisted (1865-1943), American politician and state governor
 Harris M. Plaisted (1828-1898), American Congressman and state governor
 Joan M. Plaisted (born 1945), American diplomat and ambassador
 Ralph Plaisted (1927-2008), American explorer who reached the North pole in 1968
 Trent Plaisted (born 1986), American professional basketball player
 Elenore Plaisted Abbott (1875-1935), American illustrator and painter

Given name
 George Plaisted Sanderson (1836-1915), American politician
 Alexander Plaisted Saxton (1919-2012), American historian and novelist
 Baron James Plaisted Wilde (1816-1899), British judge
 

Surnames